The Roland Jupiter-6 (JP-6) is a discontinued synthesizer, manufactured and introduced by the Roland Corporation in January 1983.

Background
Although introduced as a less expensive ($2,500-$3,000 market price) alternative to the Roland Jupiter-8, its features include some capabilities not present in the JP-8, which makes the JP-6 a successor. The Jupiter-6 is widely considered a workhorse among polyphonic analog synthesizers, capable of producing a wide variety of sounds, such as ambient drones, pads, lead synthesizer lines, unison basses and techy blips and buzzes. It is renowned for its reliability and ease, but with sophisticated programmability.

The JP-6 has 12 analog oscillators (2 per voice), and is bitimbral, allowing its keyboard to be "split" into two sounds - one with 4 voices, and one with the remaining 2 voices (either "Split 4/2" or "Split 2/4" mode).  "Whole Mode" is also available, dedicating all 6 voices to single (monotimbral) sound across the entire keyboard. Available waveforms include sawtooth, triangle, variable width pulse, square, and noise. Unusually, the JP-6 allows simultaneous selection of any or all of the waveforms in each of its two oscillator banks, an option not found on the JP-8. Oscillator sync and cross modulation are also available. "Unison Mode" allows all 12 oscillators to be triggered simultaneously by depressing a single key. Unison Mode can also be played polyphonically, with the number of oscillators triggered by each key determined by the number of keys held down.    

The JP-6 was among the first electronic instruments (alongside the Roland JX-3P and the Sequential Circuits Prophet-600) to feature MIDI, then a brand new technology. Sequential CEO Dave Smith demonstrated MIDI by connecting the Prophet to a Jupiter-6 during the January, 1983 Winter NAMM Show.

Europa, a popular firmware upgrade available from Synthcom Systems, adds a wide array of modern enhancements to the instrument's MIDI implementation, user interface, patch memory, and most especially its arpeggiator, turning the Jupiter-6 into a contemporaneously adaptable instrument and unique composition tool.

Notable users 
Charly García
Chemical Brothers
The Crystal Method
Devo
Dubstar
Goldfrapp
Greg Ham of Men at Work
Eddie Kulak of Aztec Camera
Human League
Julio Bashmore
King Crimson
 Mike O'Donnell and Junior Campbell (Musical score for the first two series of Thomas the Tank Engine & Friends)
Nathan Fake
Orbital
Orchestral Manoeuvres in the Dark
Pet Shop Boys
Ray Parker Jr.
Kevin Saunderson (of Inner City)
 Rob Preuss of The Spoons
Rhythm Plate
Tangerine Dream
The Unicorns
Thomas Gandey
Vangelis
Vašo Patejdl
Peggy Gou

References

External links
 Jupiter-6 owner's manual
 Sound on Sound's Jupiter retrospective
 Vintage Synth Explorer's Jupiter-6 entry
 Harmony Central's user reviews of the Jupiter-6
 Synthmuseum.com's Jupiter-6 entry
 Sonic State's Jupiter-6 entry

Jupiter-6
Analog synthesizers
Polyphonic synthesizers